Samhain is an integrity checker and host intrusion detection system that can be used on single hosts as well as large, UNIX-based networks. It supports central monitoring as well as powerful (and new) stealth features to run undetected in memory, using steganography.

Main features

 Complete integrity check
 uses cryptographic checksums of files to detect modifications,
 can find rogue SUID executables anywhere on a disk, and
 Centralized monitoring
 native support for logging to a central server via encrypted and authenticated connections
 Tamper resistance
 database and configuration files can be signed
 log file entries and e-mail reports are signed
 support for stealth operation

See also

 Host-based intrusion detection system comparison

References

External links
Samhain Homepage

Privacy software
Unix security-related software
Intrusion detection systems
Free security software programmed in C